Daniel Lee "Deacon" Towler (March 6, 1928 – August 1, 2001) was an American football player. He played in the National Football League (NFL) as a fullback for the Los Angeles Rams from 1950 through 1955. He was the NFL leading rusher in 1952 and ranked among the top four rushers each year from 1951 to 1954. He graduated from Washington & Jefferson College.

The football statistics website Football Nation calls Towler "the greatest running back you don't know," and "a bright, shining star who lit up the NFL for an oh-so-brief but spectacular three-year period unlike any before or since." "[F]or a three-year period in the early 1950s," says Football Nation, "Towler was the closest thing the NFL has ever produced to an unstoppable ball carrier."

The Professional Football Researchers Association named Towler to the PFRA Hall of Very Good Class of 2006 

After retiring from football, Towler was named pastor of the Lincoln Avenue Methodist Church in Pasadena, California. He was also a chaplain at California State University, Los Angeles and president of the Los Angeles County Board of Education.

References

External links
Deacon Dan Towler Official website

1928 births
2001 deaths
African-American Methodist clergy
American Methodist clergy
American football fullbacks
California State University, Los Angeles people
Los Angeles Rams players
University and college chaplains in America
Washington & Jefferson Presidents football players
Western Conference Pro Bowl players
People from Donora, Pennsylvania
Players of American football from Pennsylvania
African-American players of American football
School board members in California
20th-century American clergy
20th-century African-American sportspeople